Joseph Huber (born 4 November 1948 in Mannheim) is a retired German professor of sociology. From 1992 to 2012, he was the chair of economic and environmental sociology at Martin Luther University of Halle-Wittenberg, Germany.

He has written influential papers on monetary policy, for instance "Seigniorage Reform and Plain Money". Huber is known widely also as one of the founders of ecological modernization theory.

Selected publications

.
.
.
.
.

References

Personal University Website
Personal Website on the Money System and Sovereign Money 
 Plain Money, A Proposal for Supplying the Nations with the necessary Means in a modern Monetary System.
Seigniorage Reform and Plain Money
English-language Publications

German economists
German non-fiction writers
German sociologists
Living people
Monetary reformers
Environmental sociologists
1948 births
Academic staff of the Martin Luther University of Halle-Wittenberg
Writers from Mannheim
German male non-fiction writers